Josef Völk (born 3 December 1948 in , Lower Saxony, Germany) is an ice hockey player who played for the West German national team. He won a bronze medal at the 1976 Winter Olympics.

References

External links

1948 births
Living people
EV Füssen players
Ice hockey players at the 1968 Winter Olympics
Ice hockey players at the 1972 Winter Olympics
Ice hockey players at the 1976 Winter Olympics
Medalists at the 1976 Winter Olympics
Olympic bronze medalists for West Germany
Olympic ice hockey players of West Germany
Olympic medalists in ice hockey
West German ice hockey defencemen
Sportspeople from Lower Saxony
People from Göttingen (district)
German ice hockey defencemen